The 1974 San Francisco 49ers season was the franchise's 25th season in the National Football League and their 29th overall.

Offseason

NFL Draft

Roster

Regular season

Schedule

Standings

References

External links
 1974 49ers on Pro Football Reference
 49ers Schedule on jt-sw.com

San Francisco 49ers seasons
San Francisco 49ers
1974 in San Francisco
San